Edward Charles "Ed" Sharockman (November 4, 1939 – August 19, 2017) was a professional American football cornerback.

Sharockman graduated from the University of Pittsburgh, where he starred as a cornerback. He was drafted in the fifth round by the Minnesota Vikings in the National Football League's 1961 draft, and in the 22nd round by the Dallas Texans of the American Football League. He chose to play with the Vikings, where he spent his entire 12 season career (1961–1972). He started in Super Bowl IV.

In 1970, Sharockman enjoyed a banner day against the Dallas Cowboys, blocking a punt and recovering it for a touchdown,  also returning an intercepted Craig Morton pass for another touchdown in the Vikings' 54-13 annihilation of the eventual National Football Conference champions.

In his 12 seasons with the Vikings, he intercepted 40 passes, returned for 804 yards with three touchdowns and recovered nine fumbles, returned for 113 yards with one touchdown.

References

1939 births
2017 deaths
People from St. Clair, Pennsylvania
Players of American football from Pennsylvania
American football cornerbacks
Pittsburgh Panthers football players
Minnesota Vikings players